George Thompson VC (23 October 1920 – 23 January 1945) was a Scottish recipient of the Victoria Cross, the highest and most prestigious award for gallantry in the face of the enemy that can be awarded to British and Commonwealth forces.

Biography
Thompson was born in Trinity Gask, Perthshire and educated at Portmoak Primary School and Kinross High School. After being apprenticed to a grocer in Kinross he joined the Local Defence Volunteers when the Second World War began. In January 1941 he joined the Royal Air Force Volunteer Reserve, training as a ground crew wireless operator and serving in Iraq. He then volunteered for aircrew and was posted to RAF Bomber Command.

Details of deed
He was 24 years old and a Flight Sergeant in No. 9 Squadron when the deed took place for which he was awarded the VC. On 1 January 1945 in an attack on the Dortmund-Ems Canal, Germany, Lancaster bomber serial PD377, after releasing its bombs, was hit by two shells and a raging fire broke out. Flight Sergeant Thompson, who was the wireless operator, seeing that the mid-upper gun turret was ablaze, went at once through the smoke filled fuselage into the fire and exploding ammunition in the turret to help the gunner to a place of relative safety. He extinguished his burning clothing with his bare hands and in doing so sustained serious burns to his legs, hands and face.

He then went to the rear turret which was also ablaze and again used his already burnt bare hands to beat out flames on the gunner's clothing. Then, despite his shocking state of burns and charred clothing, he returned through the burning fuselage to report to the pilot. The crippled aircraft finally crash-landed; the rear gunner survived and made a full recovery but the mid-upper gunner  died. Flight Sergeant Thompson began to recover from his injuries in hospital but died of pneumonia three weeks later.

Legacy
Thompson's Victoria Cross is displayed at the National War Museum of Scotland, Edinburgh Castle, Edinburgh, Scotland. George Thompson is commemorated on The Portmoak Parish War Memorial, which is located within the grounds of The Bishopshire Golf Club at Portmoak in the county of Perth & Kinross, Scotland and on the Wall of Names at the international Bomber Command Centre, Lincoln

References

British VCs of World War 2 (John Laffin, 1997)
Monuments to Courage (David Harvey, 1999)
The Register of the Victoria Cross (This England, 1997)
Scotland's Forgotten Valour (Graham Ross, 1995)

External links
CWGC entry
George Thompson VC at Kinross Museum

1920 births
1945 deaths
Royal Air Force airmen
Royal Air Force personnel killed in World War II
Royal Air Force recipients of the Victoria Cross
Royal Air Force Volunteer Reserve personnel of World War II
People from Perth and Kinross
Deaths from pneumonia in the Netherlands
British World War II recipients of the Victoria Cross
Burials at Brussels Cemetery
British Home Guard soldiers
Scottish airmen